In My Time: A Personal and Political Memoir is a memoir written by former Vice President of the United States Dick Cheney with Liz Cheney.  The book was released on August 30, 2011, and outlines Cheney's accounts of 9/11, the War on Terrorism, the 2001 War in Afghanistan, the run-up to the 2003 Iraq war, enhanced interrogation techniques and other events. According to Barton Gellman, the author of Angler: The Cheney Vice Presidency, Cheney's book differs from publicly available records on details surrounding the NSA surveillance program. Cheney discusses his both good and bad interactions with his peers during the Presidency of George W. Bush.

Upon the book's release, several people quoted in it such as Secretaries of State Colin Powell and Condoleezza Rice as well as U.S. Senator John McCain stated that Cheney did not accurately recount their private conversations and meetings.

Contents
Cheney writes about his important role in the Bush administration,

Reviews
The Washington Post ran a negative review by associate editor Robert G. Kaiser. Kaiser praised the early sections of the book showing Cheney's "rise from humble origins" as an interesting story "briskly told." However, Kaiser argued that Cheney "avoids a great deal" in Cheney's depiction of the Bush administration. Kaiser wrote,

Military historian Victor Davis Hanson praised the memoir in Defining Ideas, a journal published by the Hoover Institution, and he likened Cheney to the mythical Greek figure Ajax. Hanson remarked,

Related memoirs
A Journey by Tony Blair
At the Center of the Storm: My Years at the CIA by George Tenet
Decision Points by George W. Bush
Known and Unknown: A Memoir by Donald Rumsfeld
Spoken from the Heart by Laura Bush

References

External links
 Simon & Schuster - Official homepage
 Amazon.com's book reviews and description 
 Barnes & Noble's editorial reviews and overview 
 OnTheIssues.org's book review and excerpts

2011 non-fiction books
American memoirs
War in Afghanistan (2001–2021) books
Books about the 2003 invasion of Iraq
Books on anti-terrorism policy of the United States
War on Terror books
Books about George W. Bush
Non-fiction books about the Central Intelligence Agency
Books about the September 11 attacks
Political memoirs
Dick Cheney
Collaborative memoirs
Simon & Schuster books